Three ships of the Royal Australian Navy (RAN) have been named HMAS Hobart, for Hobart, the capital city of Tasmania.

 , a Leander-class light cruiser acquired from the Royal Navy in 1938, and operating until 1947.
 , a Perth-class guided missile destroyer commissioned in 1965 and decommissioned in 2000.
 , lead ship of the Hobart-class air warfare destroyers, commissioned in 2017.

See also
, an 18-gun sloop built by the French, captured by the Royal Navy in 1794, and operated until her sale in India in 1803.

Battle honours
Ships named Hobart have earned the following battle honours:
East Indies, 1940
Indian Ocean, 1941
Mediterranean, 1941
Coral Sea, 1942
Savo Island, 1942
Guadalcanal, 1942
Pacific, 1942−45
Borneo, 1945
Vietnam, 1967−70

Royal Australian Navy ship names